Dieter Seebach is a German chemist known for his synthesis of biopolymers and dendrimers, and for his contributions to stereochemistry. He was born on 31 October 1937 in Karlsruhe. He studied chemistry at the University of Karlsruhe (TH) under the supervision of Rudolf Criegee and at Harvard University with Elias Corey finishing in 1969. After his habilitation he became professor for organic chemistry at the University of Giessen. After six years he was appointed professor at the ETH Zurich where he worked until he retired in 2003.

Work

Seebach worked on dendrimer chemistry and on the synthesis of beta-peptides. The development of the umpolung, a polarity inversion of the carbonyl group, with 1,3-propanedithiol together with Corey had a big influence on organic synthesis, and subsequently the Corey-Seebach reaction was named after them.

The Fráter–Seebach alkylation, a diastereoselective reaction of beta-hydroxy esters, is named after him.

Awards
2000 Marcel Benoist Prize
2003 Tetrahedron Prize for Creativity in Organic Chemistry & BioMedicinal Chemistry 
2004 The Ryoji Noyori Prize
2019 Arthur C. Cope Award

See also
TADDOL
DMPU
Chiral column chromatography
Corey-Seebach reaction

References

External links

Article on Seebach from 2003
Seebach homepage at ETH

1937 births
Living people
21st-century German chemists
Academic staff of ETH Zurich
Harvard University alumni
Foreign associates of the National Academy of Sciences
20th-century German chemists